Kotshila Mahavidyalaya is college at Kotshila in Purulia district. It offers undergraduate courses in arts. It is affiliated to Sidho Kanho Birsha University.

Departments

Arts
Bengali
English
History
Education
Political Science
 Geography
Physical Education

See also

References

External links
Kotshila Mahavidyalaya
Sidho Kanho Birsha University
University Grants Commission
National Assessment and Accreditation Council

Colleges affiliated to Sidho Kanho Birsha University
Universities and colleges in Purulia district
2010 establishments in West Bengal
Educational institutions established in 2010